Cindy Adams Dunn is the current Pennsylvania Secretary of Conservation and Natural Resources, having been nominated by Pennsylvania Governor Tom Wolf and confirmed in June 2015. Since November 2013, Dunn had served as the president and chief executive officer of PennFuture, a statewide environmental advocacy organization. Previously, she served as Pennsylvania Deputy Secretary of Conservation and Technical Services from 2007 until 2013.

References

Living people
State cabinet secretaries of Pennsylvania
Women in Pennsylvania politics
Shippensburg University of Pennsylvania alumni
Year of birth missing (living people)